Tan Ka Wan is a village in the Sai Kung North area of Tai Po District, Hong Kong.

Administration
Tan Ka Wan is a recognized village under the New Territories Small House Policy.

Geography
Tan Ka Wan comprises several smaller villages: Tse Uk, Lau Uk, Lam Uk and Mo Uk. The village cluster is mainly concentrated near the coast of Long Harbour. 

Together with nearby Ko Lau Wan, Tan Ka Wan forms an enclave within Sai Kung East Country Park.

A natural stream in Tan Ka Wan flows from south to north towards Long Harbour. Estuarine mangrove can be found at the coastal area.

Features
In 2014, the village was described as "sparsely populated with abandoned houses in dilapidated condition".

St. Peter's Chapel in Tan Ka Wan was built in 1873. It is one of the historic churches of Sai Kung Peninsula.

A drug rehabilitation centre, the Ling Oi Tan Ka Wan Centre, managed by the Evangelical Lutheran Church of Hong Kong is situated in Tan Ka Wan. The rehabilitation centre in Tan Ka Wan started in 1984.

References

External links

 Delineation of area of existing village Tan Ka Wan (Sai Kung North) for election of resident representative (2019 to 2022)
 Pictures of Tan Ka Wan

Villages in Tai Po District, Hong Kong
Sai Kung North